The Moche Rip Curl Pro Portugal 2015 was an event of the Association of Surfing Professionals for 2015 ASP World Tour.

This event was held from 20 to 31 October at Peniche, (Leiria, Portugal),  with 36 surfers competing.

The tournament was won by Filipe Toledo (BRA), who beat Italo Ferreira (BRA) in the final.

Round 1

Round 2

Round 3

Round 4

Round 5

Quarter finals

Semi finals

Final

References

Rip Curl Pro Portugal
2015 World Surf League
2015 in Portuguese sport
October 2015 sports events in Europe
Sport in Leiria District